The Greenville Wildlife Park was a small zoo that operated in Greenville, New Hampshire for five years, from 1998 - 2003. It closed after the death of its co-founder, Glen Eldridge.

A Sept. 26, 2003, article in The Telegraph newspaper of Nashua described the closure:

In 2002, the park lost a lawsuit over the ownership of two chimpanzees.

References 

Buildings and structures in New Hampshire
Buildings and structures in Hillsborough County, New Hampshire
Former zoos
Articles needing infobox zoo
Zoos established in 1998
Zoos disestablished in 2003